Narendra Pawar (born 27 August 1969) is a politician from the   Bharatiya Janata Party. 
Pawar was elected to the Maharashtra Legislative Assembly from the Kalyan West (Vidhan Sabha constituency) in 2014. He is a first term member of the Maharashtra Legislative Assembly

Early life and education
Pawar's  father, Baburao Pawar was an employee of  Kalyan-Dombivli Municipal Corporation, residing in Kalyan. Since childhood,Pawar has been a member of Rashtriya Swayamsevak Sangh.Pawar completed his Diploma in Civil Engineering.During his student years, he was active member of RSS inspired Akhil Bharatiya Vidyarthi Parishad. He worked for seven years as a  full time worker for the Akhil Bharatiya Vidyarthi Parishad between 1993 and 2000.

Political career
In 2005 he was elected as a corporator in Kalyan-Dombivli Municipal Corporation.Then he served as Deputy Mayor of Kalyan-Dombivli Municipal Corporation for period 2008 – 2010

Positions

ABVP
 General Secretary – Maharashtra.

Within BJP
 Secretary Kalyan (W)
 President Kalyan (W), 2003
 Prabhari of Bharatiya Janata Yuva Morcha, Maharashtra
 President Kalyan District 2013 – 2015
 Secretary Maharashtra 2015 – present
 In charge of Bhiwandi (Lok Sabha constituency)  – 2019

Municipal Corporation
 2005 – 2008: Corporator Kalyan-Dombivli Municipal Corporation
 2008 – 2010: Dy. Mayor Kalyan-Dombivli Municipal Corporation

Legislative
 2014 – 2019: Member of Maharashtra Legislative Assembly.
Pawar lost his  seat in the 2019 assembly election. Since he was denied candidacy by the BJP, he stood as a rebel independent candidate but lost the election to the Shivsena candidate.

Other Positions
 Director of Jankalyan Sahkari Bank
 President of Jan Nidhi Bank
 President Kalyan Vikas Pratishthan
 Member of Ram Mandir Trust
 Member of Paryavaran Manch.

Achievements, Contribution & Initiatives
 Planned approximately 60,000 number of trees, in & around Kalyan city.
 Successful implementation of ‘Jalyukt Shivar Abhiyan ’ in 6 villages of Jalna, Maharashtra.
Spreading awareness & implementing Central as well as State Government Policies / Schemes, so that people will get maximum benefit out of it, like Mudra, CM Relief Fund  etc.
 Knowing the importance of Indian Culture & to sustain the same, taken initiatives in Rangoli Competition in Diwali & Eco friendly Ganapati festival.
 Knowing that, Youth is face of our nation, helping them for enhancing their career by organizing various events / activities.
 Organized Biggest Public marriage function for farmers Children, at Jalna, Maharashtra where 551 couples got married.

References

Bharatiya Janata Party politicians from Maharashtra
Maharashtra MLAs 2014–2019
Marathi politicians
Living people
1969 births